Dinodocus (meaning "terrible beam") is a genus of sauropod  dinosaur, named by Richard Owen in 1884. The name is now usually considered a nomen dubium.  The only species, D. mackesoni, a name given to some fossil bones from the Lower Greensand Group (Lower Cretaceous) of Hythe, Kent, England, were formerly placed in the genus Pelorosaurus (Mantell, 1850), but a review by Upchurch et al. (2004) concluded that Dinodocus is a nomen dubium.

Discovery and naming
The holotype was discovered in 1840 by Mr H. B. Mackeson. In 1841, Richard Owen noted on the fossils. The holotype, NHMUK 14695, was listed by Owen as "portions of the corocoid, humerus and ulna, iliac, ischial and pubic bones, a large portion of the shaft of a femur, parts of a tibia and fibula, and several metatarsal bones". Owen assigned the specimen to the pliosaur Polyptychodon. In 1850, Gideon Mantell assigned the specimen to Pelorosaurus but Richard Owen placed the fossils in a separate genus, Dinodocus, in 1884. In 1908, Dinodocus was synonymized with Pelorosaurus again, this time by Arthur Smith Woodward. In 2004, Paul Upchurch validated the genus Dinodocus.

References

Early Cretaceous dinosaurs of Europe
Sauropods
Nomina dubia
Taxa named by Richard Owen
Fossil taxa described in 1884